Parectopa exorycha is a Brazilian moth of the family Gracillariidae.

References

Gracillariinae